Bukovno is a municipality and village in Mladá Boleslav District in the Central Bohemian Region of the Czech Republic. It has about 700 inhabitants.

Administrative parts
The village of Líny is an administrative part of Bukovno.

Geography
It lies in the Jizera Table.

History
The first written mention of Bukovno is from 1380. It was part of the Mladá Boleslav estate, owned by the Michalovice family until 1468. In 1584, Bukovno was bought by the Czernin family and annexed to the Kosmonosy estate. This lasted until 1734, when Bukovno was bought by Jan Gemmrich of Neuberk.

Transport
Bukovno is located on a railway line from Mělník to Mladá Boleslav and Mladějov.

Sights
The landmark of Bukovno is the Church of Saint John of Nepomuk. It was built in the Baroque style in 1769.

References

External links

Villages in Mladá Boleslav District